Briollay is a commune in the Maine-et-Loire department in western France.

Population

Sights
 Jardin botanique de Briollay

See also
 Communes of the Maine-et-Loire department

References

External links

 Official site

Communes of Maine-et-Loire